Dalsinghsarai or Dalsing Sarai is a city in the Samastipur District of Bihar, which is situated on the bank of the river Balan. Dalsinghsarai city was a tobacco and indigo production center during the British time. There is a myth about the city is that Dalsinghsarai was the first railway station of Bihar and the second of India. Dalsingh Sarai is a city council or Nagar Parishad. Mrs.Abha Sureka is the chairman of Council. and Mrs.Sujata Chowdhary is vice- chairman of the Council. It is also one of the subdivisions, Anchal and block of Bihar. Before 2010 Dalsinghsarai was a Vidhan sabha constituency but in 2010 Delimitation Commission of India snatch its status of Vidhan sabha constituency. Now it falls under "Ujiyarpur" legislative constituency and "Ujiyarpur" Lok sabha constituency.

Mr. Alok Kumar Mehta is the M.L.A of Ujiyarpur seat who is currently Minister of Land Revenue in Bihar State government and Mr. Nityanand Rai is the M.P of Ujiyarpur who is currently become the state home minister in center.
Dalsinghsarai has a diverse population, but Hindus are in majority whereas Muslims are in minority. In the past, Dalsinghsarai came under the Mithila Kingdom so here we can find Mithila culture very easily. Maithili language is mainly spoken here as well as Hindi. Vidyapatidham, which is known as the "Deoghar of Bihar", lies under Dalsinghsarai subdivision. 
Dalsinghsarai block comprises 45 villages like Gauspur Inaet, Ajnaul, Pagra, Balo chalk, etc. It is well connected by the rest of the country through railway or road network.

History 
It was named after 9th guru of Aghori named Dalpat Singh. Before that, it was called Aghoria Ghat.
 
This city has been the center of indigo cultivation during British rule. In 1902 an indigo research institute was also opened close to this city in Pusa.

There was also a cigarette factory operating under British rule because of high volume of tobacco farming in nearby areas.

Demographics
 India census, The Dalsinghsarai Nagar Parishad has population of 23,862 of which 12,552 are males while 11,310 are females as per report released by Census India 2011. Population of children with age of 0–6 is 3710 which is 15.55% of total population of Dalsinghsarai. 
The river traversing the city is Balan which is originated near Kanti (Muzaffarpur).
Dalsinghsarai is a sub-division whose sub divisional officer is Ms.Priyanka kumari, a Anchal whose Anchal Adhikari is Mr.Vijay Kumar Tiwari, a block whose block developing officer is Mr.Shashi Bhushan and a city council whose chairman is Mrs.Abha Sureka.

Roadways
Dalsingsarai is well connected by roads . This town is situated near National Highway No.-28, which links Barauni (Bihar) to the capital city of Uttar Pradesh, Lucknow, via Gorakhpur,this NH is very important due to Barauni Refinery.Three new flyover is proposed in Dalsinghsarai,first at NH28 at tri-junction of SH88,NH28 and Vidyapatidham-Dalsinghsarai Road,Second at 32 number railway crossing and third at under construction Bypass for SH88 to bypass dalsinghsarai market.It is also connected to SH 88 which connects it from Rosera and many more places.A new four lane greenfield highway is proposed between Dalsinghsarai and Purnia via Simri Bhaktiyarpur(Saharsa) which minimise the travel distance and provide hassle free travel to East India.Under construction World's longest Kacchi Dargha-Bidupur bridge which is a part of   ""Amas-Darbhanga expressway""  will be nearly 25 km from the town that provide North Bihar people's a new way to reach Patna and South Bihar.Tajpur-Bhaktiyarpur Four lane Bridge's work also resumed in 2023 which work as a new path to Rajgir,Nalanda in less hours.Rajendra setu(Simaria) and New Mokama-Simaria Bridge which connects north Bihar to South Bihar,West Bengal,Jharkhand etc is approx. 35 km

Railways
There is a myth about Dalsinghsarai,that it is the 2nd oldest railway station in India and 1st railway station in Bihar but "Royapuram"  (Tamilnadu) is the second oldest railway station(operational) of India. If we see history we would find Mahraja of Darbhanga feels the need of a railway line in Mithila,so on his own money they built (probably first in Bihar) a railway line from Darbhanga to Simaria which passes through Dalsinghsarai.Dalsinghsarai and its localities are known for its fresh vegetables",and  tobacco "सरैसा(that's why in past Britishers established a Cigratte factory in the area) which transported through railways to the rest of the country. This is the main railway station between Barauni junction and Samastipur junction with many modern facilities. Many major trains like Garib rath superfast express, Vaishali Super fast express, Avadh Assam Express, Bagh Express etc. stop here. It is well connected with other parts of country via railway. It lies under the Sonepur Division of the East Central Railway , Hajipur.Railway will build a new Dalsinghsarai Vidyapathidham Bypass Railway line of 10 km in upcoming years.In 2023 Indian Railway choose Dalsinghsarai in ""Amrit Bharat Railway scheme"" for Redevelopment of the station in phased manner and also issues money in the budget of 2023.But the most demanding and awaited project in the city is 32 no. Flyover which is neglected this time also,only 1000 rupees in 2023 budget for the project,in past Mr.Nitin Gadkari twitted for the construction in recent year,we are in 2023 but no progress could be seen there.There are approx. 42 passenger trains and 17 freight trains stop at Dalsinghsarai railway station.The following are the usual trains which stop at Dalsinghsarai:

"Train name (no.)	Arrives	Departs	Stop time days"

Dhn Smi Special (03327)	04:03	04:05	2 min	Saturday

Mfp Koaa Special (05226)	16:07	16:09	2 min	Saturday

Koaa Mfp Special (05225)	20:50	20:52	2 min	sunday

Avadh Assam Express (15609)	14:54	14:55	1 min	Daily

Ghy Jivachh Lin (25610)	08:17	08:18	1 min	Daily

Thawe Tata Express18182)	17:49	17:51	2 min	Daily

Ljn Bju Express (15204)	07:30	07:32	2 min	Daily

Vaishali Express (12553)	10:00	10:01	1 min Daily

Intercity Express (13225)	15:16	15:17	1 min except sunday

Mithila Express(13022)	15:55	15:56	1 min	Daily

Ganga Sagar Express (13186)	20:06	20:07	1 min Daily

Intercity Express (13226)	11:10	11:11	1 min	except sunday (! Note- This train route is now changed and now it is going via Samastipur, Muzaffarpur, Hajipur to Danapur.)

Bagh Express (13019)	08:10	08:11	1 min	Daily

Bju Ljn Express (15203)	21:06	21:07	1 min Daily

Gangasagar Express (13185)	04:30	04:31	1 min	Daily

Janasewa Express (13419)	18:45	18:46	1 min	Daily

Jansewa Express (13420)	00:31	00:32	1 min	Daily

Maurya Express (15027)	06:10	06:11	1 min	Daily

Tata Cpr Express (18181)	10:04	10:05	1 min	Daily

Mithilanchal Express (13155)	07:26	07:27	1 min Thursday/Sunday

Garib Rath Express (12203)	17:45	17:46	1 min	

Mithilanchal Express (13156)	16:07	16:08	1 min	Monday/Saturday

Avadh Assam Express (15910)	08:05	08:07	2 min Daily

Tirhut Express (13157)	07:26	07:27	1 min	Tuesday

Ntsk Jivachh Li (25910)	08:06	08:07	1 min Daily

Tirhut Express (13158)	16:07	16:08	1 min Wednesday

Rxl Hwh Express (13044)	02:06	02:07	1 min Thursday/Saturday

Bagh Express (13020)	22:00	22:02	2 min	Daily

Koaa Smi Express (13165)	09:04	09:05	1 min	Saturday

Maurya Express (15028)	16:34	16:36	2 min	Daily

Shc Garib Rath (12204)	06:45	06:47	2 min	Wednesday/Saturday/sunday

Hwh Rxl Express (13043)	09:04	09:05	1 min	Friday/ Wednesday

Vaishali Express (12554)	16:20	16:22	2 min	Daily

Bju Gwl Mail (11123)	19:15	19:16	1 min	Daily

Gwl Bju Mail (11124)	12:50	12:52	2 min	Daily

Mithila Express (13021)	02:40	02:41	1 min	Daily

Smi Dhn Special (03328)	12:58	13:00	2 min Sunday

Smi Koaa Express (13166)	02:06	02:07	1 min	Sunday

References

Cities and towns in Samastipur district